C.W. Fernbach (1915–1967) was an Austrian actor. He was married to the actress Dany Sigel.

Selected filmography
 The Immortal Face (1947)
 Crown Prince Rudolph's Last Love (1955)
 Espionage (1955)
 The Congress Dances (1955)
 Emperor's Ball (1956)
 Love, Girls and Soldiers (1958)
 Crime Tango (1960)
 The Adventures of Count Bobby (1961)
 The Sweet Life of Count Bobby (1962)

External links

1915 births
1967 deaths
Austrian male film actors
20th-century Austrian male actors
People from Bruck an der Leitha
20th-century Austrian composers
20th-century Austrian male musicians